The Capella Stakes (Japanese カペラステークス) is a Grade 3 horse race for Thoroughbreds aged three and over, run in December over a distance of 1200 metres on dirt at Nakayama Racecourse.

The race was first run in 2008 and has held Grade 3 status since 2009.

Winners since 2008

See also
 Horse racing in Japan
 List of Japanese flat horse races

References

Dirt races in Japan